is a railway station in Nishi-ku, Fukuoka, Fukuoka Prefecture, Japan. It is jointly operated by JR Kyushu and the Fukuoka City Transportation Bureau. The station symbol of the subway station is a yacht in yellow, symbolising nearby Odo yacht harbour(ja).

Lines

Chikuhi Line

Station layout
This is an elevated station with two island platforms serving four tracks.

Platforms

Track 2 and 3 are connected to Fukuoka City Subway Meinohama rolling stock maintenance depot near Shimoyamato Station .

History

April 15, 1925: Station is established by Kitakyushu Railroad
October 1, 1937: The Railroad Ministry nationalizes all railroads, this station becomes a station of the Chikuhi Line
March 22, 1983: Electrification of the track between Meinohama Station and Karatsu Station is completed and the track from Meinohama Station to Hakata Station is discontinued. The Fukuoka City Subway Number 1 Line (now the Kūkō Line) opens accompanied by a mutual operating agreement between it and the Chikuhi Line.
April 1, 1987: With the privatization of JNR, the station came under the control of JR Kyushu.

Passenger statistics
In fiscal 2016, the station was used by an average of 5,547 passengers daily (boarding passengers only), and it ranked 33rd among the busiest stations of JR Kyushu.

References

External links
 Fukuoka City Subway Meinohama Station 

Railway stations in Japan opened in 1925
Chikuhi Line
Kūkō Line (Fukuoka City Subway)
Railway stations in Fukuoka Prefecture
Stations of Kyushu Railway Company